Radiohole is a collective of artists that have been creating original devised performance works since 1998.

Radiohole has created 17 original full-length shows and numerous short pieces, and has been described by The Drama Review as “the quintessential American performance group.”

In 2000, Radiohole and The Collapsable Giraffe founded the Obie Award-winning space The Collapsable Hole in Williamsburg, Brooklyn. The artist-run venue has since relocated to Westbeth in  The West Village.

Radiohole was founded by Erin Douglass, Eric Dyer, Scott Halvorsen Gillette, and Maggie Hoffman.

External links 
 RADIOHOLE 
 Collapsable Hole

References 

American artist groups and collectives
Theatrical organizations in the United States